Bernadetta is a female French and Polish variation of the name Bernard, which means "brave as a bear". Notable persons with that name include:

People 

Bernadetta Blechacz (born 1955), Polish javelin thrower
Bernadeta Bocek-Piotrowska (born 1970), Polish cross country skier 
Bernadetta Matuszczak (born 1937), Polish composer

Fictional characters 

 Bernadetta von Varley, a shy noble lady from Fire Emblem: Three Houses

See also
 Bernadotte (disambiguation)
 Bernadette (disambiguation)

French feminine given names